Matthew Swann,  performing under the name Astral Swans, is a Canadian singer-songwriter from Calgary, Alberta, signed to Dan Mangan's Madic Records, an imprint of Arts & Crafts Productions. His music style has been described as "introspective late 60s folk à la Nick Drake filtered through an avant-garde 90s lens." His 2015 album, All My Favorite Singers Are Willie Nelson, was described by VICE as "a stark, beautiful project [...] steeped in 60s psych-folk mythology and loner punk iconography." His latest album, Strange Prison, was released in May 2018. Previously Matthew Swann was a member of Hot Little Rocket and  Extra Happy Ghost!!!

Discography

Studio albums
2015: All My Favorite Singers Are Willie Nelson (Madic Records / Arts & Crafts Productions)
2018: Strange Prison (Saved By Vinyl / Tiny Room Records)

Singles
2014: You Carry A Sickness / Park Street (Madic Records / Arts & Crafts Productions)
2018: Controls (song) (Saved By Vinyl / Tiny Room Records)
2018: What Are You Gonna Do With Yourself (Saved By Vinyl / Tiny Room Records)

EPs
2014: We Went to Europe and Conquered Death (tour EP)

Compilation albums
2015: Good People Rock: A Yellow Bird Project Covers Compilation (Madic Records / Arts & Crafts Productions)

References

Arts & Crafts Productions artists
Canadian male singer-songwriters
Canadian singer-songwriters
Living people
Musicians from Calgary
Year of birth missing (living people)